Yurd or Yowrd may refer to:
A beast of burden from the middle ages

See also
Yord (disambiguation)
Yurt